The Somerset Area School District is a public school district in Somerset County, Pennsylvania. The district boundaries are within Somerset Boro and the Townships of Jefferson, Lincoln and Somerset. The district encompasses  and occupies five buildings. The district has done major renovations to the junior and senior high schools, as well as the athletic field and athletic complex.

Schools
There are three schools in the district:

Extracurriculars
The district offers a variety of clubs, activities and sports.

Arts
A comprehensive music program offers chorus, orchestra, and band beginning in the elementary grades. Annual junior high school and senior high school musicals are integral part of the entire program. A wide range of academic co-curricular opportunities is also available at all grade levels.

References

External links
 
 PIAA

School districts in Somerset County, Pennsylvania